Rastellum is an extinct genus of molluscs, which lived from the Middle Jurassic to the Late Cretaceous. This species is also known as Arctostrea carinata.

Subtaxa
Species within this genus include:
 †Rastellum (Arctostrea)   Pervinquiere 1910
 †Rastellum allobrogensis  Pictet and Roux 1853
 †Rastellum deshayesi  d'Orbigny 1853
 †Rastellum diluvianum  Linnaeus 1767
 †Rastellum ricordeana  d'Orbigny 1850

Fossil record

Fossils of Rastellum are found from the Middle Jurassic until the Late Cretaceous (age range: from 161.2 to 66.043 million years ago.). They are present in the Cretaceous marine strata throughout the world, including Afghanistan, Algeria, Argentina, Belgium, Brazil, Bulgaria, Cuba, the Czech Republic, Egypt, France, Gabon, Germany, India, Iran, Italy, Japan, Kazakhstan, Libya, Madagascar, Mozambique, the Netherlands, Pakistan, Peru, Russia, Spain, Sweden, Tunisia, Turkey, Turkmenistan, Ukraine, the United Kingdom and United States. They can also be found in the Jurassic marine strata of India, Japan, Mexico and Poland.

Description 
These oysters had a narrow-valved, tubular shell, which was composed of regularly alternating sharp ridges and deep folds. The vulnerable commissure (along which the valves meet) was sunk.

Lifestyle 
This genus inhabited warm waters, where it cemented itself with the pointed vertebrae to shells or corals. Oysters belonging to the genus Rastellum were stationary epifaunal suspension feeders.

References 

 (1993) - Fossielen:  Sesam Natuur Handboeken, Bosch & Keuning, Baarn. ISBN 90-246-4924-2

Ostreidae